Chabria is a surname. Notable people with the surname include:

Aarti Chabria (born 1982), Indian actress and former model 
Jane Chabria (1940–2004), American Montessori educator
Priya Sarukkai Chabria, Indian poet and novelist